Adiós (Spanish: 'goodbye') or Adios may refer to:

Music

Albums
Adios (Böhse Onkelz album), 2004
Adiós (Flans album), 1990
Adiós (Glen Campbell album), the final album by Glen Campbell, 2017
Adios (KMFDM album), 1999
Adios: The Greatest Hits, the final album by Christian rock band Audio Adrenaline

Songs 
"Adiós" (Ricky Martin song), 2014
"Adiós", a song by Don Omar
"Adios", a song composed by Enric Madriguera, performed instrumentally by Glenn Miller Orchestra, Billy May, and others
"Adios", a song by Everglow from their second single album Hush
"Adiós", a song by Glen Campbell from Adiós
"Adiós", a song by Gustavo Cerati from the album Ahí vamos
"Adiós", a song by Jesse & Joy from their studio album Electricidad
"Adiós", a song by Juan Gabriel from his studio album Siempre en Mi Mente
"Adiós", a song by Kany García from her eponymous album
"Adiós", a song by La Oreja de Van Gogh from their album Lo Que te Conté Mientras te Hacías la Dormida
"Adios", a song by Linda Ronstadt from Cry Like a Rainstorm, Howl Like the Wind
"Adios", a song by Migos from Y.R.N. (Young Rich Niggas)
"Adios", a song by Nellie McKay from the album Home Sweet Mobile Home 
"Adiós", a song by Rammstein from the album Mutter
"Adiós", a song by RBD from their last studio album Para Olvidarte de Mí
"Adiós", a song by Sebastián Yatra
"Adiós", a song by Selena Gomez from the extended play Revelación
"Adios", a song by Twelve Foot Ninja from the album Outlier

Other uses
Adios (horse), a champion harness racing sire
Adiós, Navarre, a place in Spain

See also
Adieu (disambiguation)
Goodbye (disambiguation)